Micromonospora sagamiensis is an endophytic actinomycete. It produces sagamicin, an aminoglycoside antibiotic, as well as several mutational variants. Its cell wall contains only D-alanine.

References

Further reading

External links

LPSN
Type strain of Micromonospora sagamiensis at BacDive -  the Bacterial Diversity Metadatabase

Micromonosporaceae
Bacteria described in 2005